is a manga by Maki Murakami, author of the popular manga Gravitation.

Plot
The story is about young gamer Kaito Suzuki, who one day discovers a video game that transports the player to a different dimension.

Upon reaching this strange new world, Kaito discovers a boy known as the "navigator", aptly dubbed "Nata". In Gamerz Heaven, the real world is referred to as the "Second Zone". All enemies in Gamerz Heaven are after Nata and Kaito can only beat the game by saving him.

Kaito soon discovers in the game that everything that happens in it also affects the real world, which poses a problem from the start. Another posing threat is that Gamerz Heaven is only a beta version, so Kaito has a limited number of saves.

Soon after starting the game, Kaito is attacked by the class president, Ogura. Ogura falls to Kaito and vanishes from the Second Zone. Now no one believes that Ogura ever existed except for Kaito's best friend Kawashima, who loves video games just as much as Kaito. Later, Kaito eventually convinces other friends Rio, and Ren, who didn't believe him until a "meteor" hits the center of Tokyo, which was actually the work of the first area boss of Gamerz Heaven, Rush.

Release
The manga is serialized in and printed by Mag Garden publishers in Japan.  Four volumes have been released.

In North America it is licensed by ADV Manga, who have so far released the first two volumes. The series appears to be on indefinite hiatus, as volume two was released in English on February 5, 2005, and as of May 1, 2010, no further releases have been announced. The official page for the manga has also been removed from ADV's website.

References

External links
 Gamerz Heaven listing at ADV Manga (archive)
 

ADV Manga
Mag Garden manga
Shōnen manga